Kilmore or Killmore, locally pronounced 'Kilmoor', is a village and townland in south County Wexford, Ireland, about  from Wexford town.

History

The village's English name, Kilmore, derives from the Irish An Chill Mhór, meaning "big church". According to mid-19th century sources, its Yola language name was Kilmoor.

Evidence of ancient settlement in the area includes a number of ringfort sites in the surrounding townlands of Sarshill, Lannagh and Rickardstown. An ecclesiastical enclosure, in the townland of Grange, contains the former parish church of Kilmore. The ruined church, which is "probably of early origin", contains a number of early 17th century memorials. The existing church within the village, St. Mary's Roman Catholic church, dates to 1802.

A tradition of carol singing in Kilmore, at St. Mary's RC Church, has taken place at Christmas time since the 1750s. The carols were written by Very Rev. William Devereux, P.P., Piercestown (of The Ring, Tacumshane) and Bishop Luke Waddinge (of Ferns). In all, there are thirteen carols, eight of which are sung during the Christmas period, the first at first Mass on Christmas Day and the last one on Sunday nearest Twelfth Day.

Public transport
Wexford Bus operate several services a day (not Sundays) between Wexford and Kilmore Quay via Johnstown Castle, Bridgetown and Kilmore. Bus Éireann route 383 operates between Wexford railway station and Kilmore Quay via Kilmore on Wednesdays and Saturdays only.

See also
 List of towns and villages in Ireland

References

Towns and villages in County Wexford